Ochyrotica salomonica is a moth of the family Pterophoridae. It is known from New Guinea and the Solomon Islands.

References

External links
Papua Insects

Ochyroticinae
Moths described in 1991